Kızıllar is a village in the Çavdır District of Burdur Province in Turkey. Its population is 433 (2021).

References

Villages in Çavdır District